The HP-75C and HP-75D were hand-held computers programmable in BASIC, made by Hewlett-Packard from 1982 to 1986.

The HP-75 had a single-line liquid crystal display, 48 KiB system ROM and 16 KiB RAM, a comparatively large keyboard (albeit without a separate numeric pad), a manually operated magnetic card reader (2×650 bytes per card), 4 ports for memory expansion (1 for RAM and 3 for ROM modules), and an HP-IL interface that could be used to connect printers, storage and electronic test equipment.  The BASIC interpreter also acted as a primitive operating system, providing file handling capabilities for program storage using RAM, cards, or cassettes/diskettes (via HP-IL).

Other features included a text editor as well as an appointment reminder with alarms, similar to functions of modern PDAs.

The HP-75D (1984–1986) added a port for a bar code wand, often used for inventory control tasks.

The HP-75 was comparatively expensive with an MSRP of $995 ($2,014 in 2005) for the 75C or $1095 ($2,058 in 2005) for the 75D, making it less popular than the cheaper successor model, the HP-71B.

The HP-75C has a KANGAROO printed on its PCB, as its codename (see link for picture).

HP-75D codename's is MERLIN.

Reception
BYTE praised the flexibility of the appointment scheduler, which the review noted could comprise part of a real-time control system because of its ability to execute BASIC programs. It concluded that the computer "is a well-integrated and powerful machine ... if you are interested in ... a very portable computer with powerful real-time scheduling capabilities, you should look closely at the HP-75".

References

External links 

 HP-75 at the MoHPC
 HP Journal, June 1983 Article about the HP-75C design, the IL interface and the card reader
Some nice internal views at MyCalcDB (see the Kangaroo on the PCB)

75C D
Pocket computers
Products introduced in 1982